Jaboka, is a town and union council (no. 9) in Okara District, located in the Punjab province of Pakistan.
It is situated at an altitude of 161 metres (531 feet) and is one of the larger towns of Okara district. Jaboka serves as a commercial and educational hub for over 20 surrounding villages. It is home to markets for garments, cosmetics, jewelry, and shoes.

The town derived its name from the people who lived in the area 70 to 80 years prior, who were referred to as "Jaboka." It boasts two historic buildings constructed in the early 20th century and has a population of approximately 60,000.

Jaboka is inhabited by a diverse population, including Jutt, Raos, Ranas, Arain, Wattos, and Kharals castes. There are four government schools in the town, two for boys and two for girls. Additionally, there is a Baharia Foundation College (BFC), established on 15 April 2013, and the Shaheen-e-Millat Model Secondary School, a private school affiliated with the Punjab Education Foundation (PEF), founded in 1994.

References

Union councils of Okara District